Petroscirtes thepassii, the Thepas' sabretooth blenny or the Thepas' fangblenny, is a species of combtooth blenny found in the western central Pacific ocean.  This species reaches a length of  SL. The specific name of this blenny honours the collector of the type, the military surgeon A.H. Thepass.

References

thepassii
Fish described in 1853